The Thai-Bharat Cultural Lodge (อาศรมวัฒนธรรมไทย-ภารต) is one of the most prestigious Indian cultural organisation in Thailand that seeks to promote comparative studies and exchange between Thai and Indian history and culture. It was founded in 1940 in Bangkok by Swami Satyananda Puri with encouragement from the Indian Nobel Laureate Rabindranath Tagore. The Swami Satyananda Puri foundation was established by the Thai-Bharat Cultural Lodge in 1942. The SSPF library today is a reference library that houses many old and rare Indian texts. The foundation is also involved in promoting work on Indian culture, especially on the Ramayana.

Today, the TBCL promotes Indian cultural affairs in Thailand and supports Thai and Indian students, studying both in Thailand as well as for studies in India. The Indian government also provides assistance to the Cultural lodge for promoting Indian languages and culture.

References

 .

Overseas Indian organisations
Asian culture
Thai culture
Indian Independence League
Cultural organizations based in Thailand
Memorials to Rabindranath Tagore
Organizations established in 1940
1940 establishments in Thailand
Cultural promotion organizations